Robert Carmichael (born 1885) was a Scottish footballer who played for Sunderland, St Mirren, Oldham Athletic, Third Lanark, Clyde and Dumbarton.

References

1885 births
Scottish footballers
Dumbarton F.C. players
Clyde F.C. players
Scottish Football League players
English Football League players
Date of birth missing
Year of death missing
Baillieston Juniors F.C. players
Sunderland A.F.C. players
St Mirren F.C. players
Oldham Athletic A.F.C. players
Third Lanark A.C. players
Association football fullbacks
Footballers from Paisley, Renfrewshire